Warakagoda is a Sinhalese name that may refer to
Given name
Warakagoda Sri Gnanarathana Thero (born 1942), Sri Lankan Buddhist monk

Surname
Deepal Warakagoda (born 1965), Sri Lankan ornithologist 
Wijeratne Warakagoda, Sri Lankan actor 

Sinhalese surnames